Torch Song is a 1953 American Technicolor musical drama film distributed by Metro-Goldwyn-Mayer and starring Joan Crawford and Michael Wilding in a story about a Broadway star and her blind rehearsal pianist. The film was directed by Charles Walters and produced by Sidney Franklin, Henry Berman and Charles Schnee. Crawford's singing voice was dubbed by India Adams.

Crawford lip-syncs to the recording Adams originally made for Cyd Charisse in a number discarded from the 1953 film, The Band Wagon. That's Entertainment III includes a segment presenting the two numbers side-by-side, in split screen.

The film marked Crawford's return to MGM after leaving to studio to join Warner Bros. in 1944. Her original recordings for the soundtrack, which were not used in the film, have survived and have been included in home video releases.

Cast
 Joan Crawford as Jenny Stewart
 India Adams as Jenny's dubbed singing voice
 Michael Wilding as Tye Graham
 Gig Young as Cliff Willard
 Marjorie Rambeau as Mrs. Stewart
 Henry Morgan as Joe Denner
 Dorothy Patrick as Martha
 James Todd as Philip Norton
 Eugene Loring as Gene, the Dance Director
 Paul Guilfoyle as Monty Rolfe
 Benny Rubin as Charles Maylor
 Peter Chong as Peter
 Maidie Norman as Anne
 Nancy Gates as Celia Stewart
 Chris Warfield as Chuck Peters
 Rudy Render as Singer at Party
 Bill Lee as Singer's dubbed singing voice

Musical numbers
 "You're All the World to Me" – Danced by Crawford and Walters
 "Follow Me" – Sung by Crawford (dubbed by Adams)
 "Two-Faced Woman" (outtake) – Sung by Crawford (dubbed by Adams)
 "You Won't Forget Me" – Sung by Crawford (dubbed by Adams)
 "Follow Me" (reprise) – Sung by Render (dubbed by Lee)
 "Two-Faced Woman" – Sung and danced by Crawford (dubbed by Adams) and chorus
 "Tenderly" – Sung partially by Crawford along to a recording by Adams

Reception
Otis Guernsey Jr. in the New York Herald Tribune wrote "Joan Crawford has another of her star-sized roles...she is vivid and irritable, volcanic and feminine...Here is Joan Crawford all over the screen, in command, in love and in color, a real movie star in what amounts to a carefully produced one-woman show."

According to MGM records, the film made $1,135,000 in the U.S. and Canada and $533,000 elsewhere, resulting in a loss of $260,000. The film is regarded as a camp classic and a possible influence on Faye Dunaway's portrayal of Crawford in Mommie Dearest.

Accolades
Rambeau was nominated for Best Actress in a Supporting Role at the 26th Academy Awards.

References

External links
 
 
 
 
 

1953 films
1953 romantic drama films
American musical drama films
American romantic drama films
American romantic musical films
Films scored by Adolph Deutsch
Films about actors
Films based on short fiction
Films directed by Charles Walters
1950s musical drama films
1950s romantic musical films
Films with screenplays by John Michael Hayes
Metro-Goldwyn-Mayer films
Films based on works by I. A. R. Wylie
1950s English-language films
1950s American films
Films about disability